Springfield is a locality in Victoria, Australia, located approximately 53 km from Swan Hill, Victoria.

Springfield Post Office opened in 1902, was renamed Springfield Station around 1907 (there was another Springfield Post Office near Woodend) and closed in 1930.

References

Towns in Victoria (Australia)